Broadcaster may refer to:

 A presenter of any syndicated media program
 A broadcasting organization, one responsible for audio and video content and/or their transmission
 A sports commentator on television or radio
 Broadcaster, currently known as Fender Telecaster, a solid-body electric guitar
 A broadcast spreader used in farming